Lucien Rich (2 November 1892 – 10 October 1976) was a French racing cyclist. He rode in the 1923 Tour de France.

References

1892 births
1976 deaths
French male cyclists
Place of birth missing